In chess, a flight square or escape square is a safe square to which a piece, especially a king, can move if it is threatened.

Providing one's piece with flight squares can prevent the opponent from winning material or delivering checkmate. For example, in the Morphy Defence, the white c-pawn may be advanced to provide the light-squared white bishop with a flight square. Conversely, it is possible to take away an enemy piece's flight squares, known as domination.

Luft 

In chess,  (the German word for "air", sometimes also "space" or "breath") designates the space or square left by a pawn move into which a king (usually a castled one) may then retreat, especially such a space made intentionally to avoid back-rank checkmate. A move leaving such a space is often said to "give the king some luft". The term "luft", "lufting", or "lufted" may also be used (as an English participle) to refer to the movement of the relevant pawn creating luft.

Preventing an opponent from lufting a pawn (for example by pinning it or moving a piece to the square in front of it) is a tactic that may lead to checkmate. A king's access to his luft might also be denied by the opponent subjecting the space or square to attack.

The German  is a close cognate to the English "lift", which is also used in chess, e.g., .

Examples 
In the diagram at left, "X"s mark luft to which the king can escape back-rank checkmate delivered by the queen. Theoretical enemy knights in the indicated positions deny the king access to his luft. Black dots indicate areas where threats emanating from enemy pieces capable of capturing diagonally could also deny access.

Being up a queen in the game on the right, Black will win unless he overlooks the threat of Ng6 (which sets up checkmate via Rh8#). Black wouldn't be able to capture the knight or create luft because his f-pawn is pinned by White's bishop, and his g-pawn cannot advance if a piece is on g6 blockading it. White's king is temporarily safe from check in his luft. (Black can neutralize the threat of Ng6 by playing Qb8, as then Ng6 can be met by the discovered check of Nf5+, winning the checkmate-threatening h4 rook after White reacts.)

See also
Pawn structure

References

Bibliography

Chess terminology
Chess strategy